Emmylou is a given name or nickname.

Emmylou Harris (born 1947) is an American singer, songwriter, and musician.

Emmylou may also refer to:

People 

 Emmylou Taliño-Mendoza (born 1972),  a Filipino politician

Music 

 Emmylou (song), by First Aid Kit on their Lion's Roar album

Other 
 EmmyLou Sugarbean, a fictional cartoon character on the television series American Dad! 
 PS Emmylou, a river ship in Australia